Tony Alamo may refer to:

 Tony Alamo (1934–2017), American founder of the Alamo Christian Foundation
 Antonio Alamo, Jr., known as Tony Alamo, American physician and Nevada gaming official